Giambattista Vico (born Giovan Battista Vico ; ; 23 June 1668 – 23 January 1744) was an Italian philosopher, rhetorician, historian, and jurist during the Italian Enlightenment. He criticized the expansion and development of modern rationalism, finding Cartesian analysis and other types of reductionism impractical to human life, and he was an apologist for classical antiquity and the Renaissance humanities, in addition to being the first expositor of the fundamentals of social science and of semiotics. He is recognised as one of the first Counter-Enlightenment figures in history.

The Latin aphorism Verum esse ipsum factum ("truth is itself something made") coined by Vico is an early instance of constructivist epistemology. He inaugurated the modern field of the philosophy of history, and, although the term philosophy of history is not in his writings, Vico spoke of a "history of philosophy narrated philosophically." Although he was not an historicist, contemporary interest in Vico usually has been motivated by historicists, such as Isaiah Berlin, a philosopher and historian of ideas, Edward Said, a literary critic, and Hayden White, a metahistorian.

Vico's intellectual magnum opus is the book Scienza Nuova or New Science (1725), which attempts a systematic organization of the humanities as a single science that recorded and explained the historical cycles by which societies rise and fall.

Biography
Born to a bookseller in Naples, Italy, Giovan Battista Vico attended several schools, but ill health and dissatisfaction with the scholasticism of the Jesuits led to his being educated at home by tutors. Evidence from his autobiographical work indicates that Vico likely was an autodidact educated under paternal influence, during a three-year absence from school, consequence of an accidental fall when the boy was seven years old. Giovan Battista's formal education was at the University of Naples from which he graduated in 1694, as Doctor of Civil and Canon Law.

In 1686, after surviving a bout of typhus, he accepted a job as a tutor, in Vatolla, south of Salerno, which became a nine-year professional engagement that lasted till 1695. Four years later, in 1699, Vico married Teresa Caterina Destito, a childhood friend, and accepted a chair in rhetoric at the University of Naples, which he held until ill-health retirement, in 1741. Throughout his academic career, Vico would aspire to, but never attain, the more respectable chair of jurisprudence; however, in 1734, he was appointed historiographer royal, by Charles III, King of Naples, at a salary greater than he had earned as a university professor.

The rhetoric and humanism of Vico
Vico's version of rhetoric is a product of his humanistic and pedagogic concerns. In the 1708 commencement speech De Nostri Temporis Studiorum Ratione (On the Order of the Scholarly Disciplines of Our Times), Vico said that whoever "intends a career in public life, whether in the courts, the senate, or the pulpit" should be taught to "master the art of topics and [to] defend both sides of a controversy, be it on Nature, Man, or politics, in a freer and brighter style of expression, so he can learn to draw on those arguments which are most probable and have the greatest degree of verisimilitude"; yet, in Scienza Nuova, Vico denounced defending both sides in controversies as false eloquence.

As Royal Professor of Latin Eloquence, Vico prepared students for higher studies in the fields of Law and of Jurisprudence; thus, his lessons were about the formal aspects of the canon of rhetoric, including the arrangement and the delivery of an argument. Yet he chose to emphasize the Aristotelian connection of rhetoric with logic and dialectic, thereby placing ends (rhetoric) at their center. Vico's objection to modern rhetoric is that it is disconnected from common sense (sensus communis), defined as the "worldly sense" that is common to all men.

In lectures and throughout the body of his work, Vico's rhetoric begins from a central argument (medius terminus), which is to be clarified by following the order of things as they arise in our experience. Probability and circumstance retain their proportionate importance, and discovery—reliant upon topics (loci)—supersedes axioms derived through reflective, abstract thought. In the tradition of classical Roman rhetoric, Vico sets out to educate the orator (rhetorician) as the transmitter of the oratio, a speech with ratio (reason) at the centre. What is essential to the oratorical art (Gr. ῥητορική, rhētorikē) is the orderly link between common sense and an end commensurate with oratory; an end that is not imposed upon the imagination from above (in the manner of the moderns and dogmatic Christianity), but that is drawn from common sense, itself.  In the tradition of Socrates and Cicero, Vico's true orator will be midwife to the birth of "the true" (as an idea) from "the certain", the ignorance in the mind of the student.

Rediscovery of "the most ancient wisdom" of the senses, a wisdom that is humana stultitia ("human foolishness"), Vico's emphases on the importance of civic life and of professional obligations are in the humanist tradition. He would call for a maieutic oratory art against the grain of the modern privilege of the dogmatic form of reason, in what he called the "geometrical method" of René Descartes and the logicians at the Port-Royal-des-Champs abbey.

Response to the Cartesian method

As he relates in his autobiography, Vico returned to Naples from Vatolla to find "the physics of Descartes at the height of its renown among the established men of letters." Developments in both metaphysics and the natural sciences abounded as the result of Cartesianism. Widely disseminated by the Port Royal Logic of Antoine Arnauld and Pierre Nicole, Descartes's method was rooted in verification: the only path to truth, and thus knowledge, was through axioms derived from observation. Descartes's insistence that the "sure and indubitable" (or, "clear and distinct") should form the basis of reasoning had an obvious impact on the prevailing views of logic and discourse. Studies in rhetoric—indeed all studies concerned with civic discourse and the realm of probable truths—met with increasing disdain.

Vico's humanism and professional concerns prompted an obvious response that he would develop throughout the course of his writings: the realms of verifiable truth and human concern share only a slight overlap, yet reasoning is required in equal measure in both spheres. One of the clearest and earliest forms of this argument is available in the De Italorum Sapientia, where Vico argues that

Vico's position here and in later works is not that the Cartesian method is irrelevant, but that its application cannot be extended to the civic sphere. Instead of confining reason to a string of verifiable axioms, Vico suggests (along with the ancients) that appeals to phronēsis (φρόνησις or practical wisdom) must also be made, and likewise appeals to the various components of persuasion that comprise rhetoric. Vico would reproduce this argument consistently throughout his works, and would use it as a central tenet of the Scienza Nuova.

The principle of Verum factum
Vico is best known for his verum factum principle, first formulated in 1710 as part of his De antiquissima Italorum sapientia, ex linguae latinae originibus eruenda (1710) ("Of the most ancient wisdom of the Italians, unearthed from the origins of the Latin language"). The principle states that truth is verified through creation or invention and not, as per Descartes, through observation: "The criterion and rule of the true is to have made it. Accordingly, our clear and distinct idea of the mind cannot be a criterion of the mind itself, still less of other truths. For while the mind perceives itself, it does not make itself." This criterion for truth would later shape the history of civilization in Vico's opus, the Scienza Nuova (The New Science, 1725), because he would argue that civil life—like mathematics—is wholly constructed.

The Scienza Nuova

The New Science (1725, Scienza Nuova) is his major work and has been highly influential in the philosophy of history, and for historicists such as Isaiah Berlin and Hayden White.

Influence
Samuel Beckett's first published work, in the selection of critical essays on James Joyce entitled Our Exagmination Round His Factification for Incamination of Work in Progress, is "Dante... Bruno. Vico.. Joyce". In it, Beckett sees a profound influence of Vico's philosophy and poetics—as well the cyclical form of the Scienza Nuova—on the avant-garde compositions of Joyce, and especially the titular Work in Progress, viz. Finnegans Wake.

In Knowledge and Social Structure (1974), Peter Hamilton identified Vico as the "sleeping partner" of the Age of Enlightenment. Despite having been relatively unknown in his 18th-century time, and read only in his native Naples, the ideas of Vico are predecessors to the ideas of the intellectuals of the Enlightenment. Moreover, recognition of Vico's intellectual influence began in the 19th century, when the French Romantic historians used his works as methodological models and guides.

In Capital: Critique of Political Economy (1867), Karl Marx's mention of Vico indicates their parallel perspectives about history, the role of historical actors, and an historical method of narrative. Marx and Vico saw social-class warfare as the means by which men achieve the end of equal rights; Vico called that time the "Age of Men". Marx concluded that such a state of affairs is the optimal end of social change in a society, but Vico thought that such complete equality of rights would lead to socio-political chaos and the consequent collapse of society. In that vein, Vico proposed a social need for religion, for a supernatural divine providence to keep order in human society.

In Orientalism (1978), Edward Said acknowledged his scholar's debt to Vico, whose "ideas anticipate and later infiltrate the line of German thinkers I am about to cite. They belong to the era of Herder and Wolf, later to be followed by Goethe, Humboldt, Dilthey, Nietzsche, Gadamer, and finally the great twentieth century Romance philologists Erich Auerbach, Leo Spitzer, and Ernst Robert Curtius." As a humanist and early philologist, Vico represented "a different, alternative model that has been extremely important to me in my work", which differed from mainstream Western prejudice against the Orient and the dominating "standardization" that came with modernity and culminated in National Socialism. That the interdependence of human history and culture facilitates the scholars' task to "take seriously Vico's great observation that men make their own history, that what they can know is what they have made, and extend it to geography. As geographical and cultural entities—to say nothing of historical entities—such locales, regions, and geographical sectors as 'Orient' and 'Occident' are man-made."

Works
 Opere di G. B. Vico. Fausto Nicolini (ed.), Bari: Laterza, 1911–41.
 De Antiquissima Italorum Sapientia ex Linguae Originibus Eruenda Libri Tres (On the Most Ancient Wisdom of the Italians Unearthed from the Origins of the Latin Language). 1710, Palmer, L. M., trans. Ithaca: Cornell UP, 1988.
 Institutiones Oratoriae (The Art of Rhetoric). 1711–1741, Pinton, Girogio, and Arthur W. Shippee, trans. Amsterdam: Editions Rodopi B.V., 1984.*  "On Humanistic Education", trans. Giorgio A. Pinton and Arthur W. Shippee.  Ithaca:   Cornell UP, 1993.
 On the Study Methods of Our Time, trans. Elio Gianturco.  Ithaca:  Cornell UP, 1990.
 Universal right (Diritto universale). Translated from Latin and Edited by Giorgio Pinton and Margaret Diehl. Amsterdam/New York, Rodopi, 2000
 On the Most Ancient Wisdom of the Italians: Unearthed from the Origins of the Latin Language, trans. L. M. Palmer. Ithaca, Cornell UP, 1988.
 Scienza Nuova (The First New Science). 1725, Pompa, Leon, trans. Cambridge: Cambridge UP, 2002.
 The New Science of Giambattista Vico, (1744). trans. Thomas G. Bergin and Max H. Fisch.  Ithaca:  Cornell UP, 2nd ed. 1968.

See also
New Vico Studies (Institute for Vico Studies at Emory University)
Recapitulation theory
Finnegans Wake

Notes

References

Fabiani, Paolo. "The Philosophy of the Imagination in Vico and Malebranche". F.U.P. (Florence UP), Italian edition 2002, English edition 2009.
Goetsch, James. Vico’s Axioms: The Geometry of the Human World.. New Haven: Yale UP, 1995.
Mooney, Michael. Vico in the Tradition of Rhetoric. New Jersey: Princeton UP, 1985.
Pompa, Leon. Vico: A Study of the New Science. Cambridge: Cambridge UP, 1990.

Further reading
Andreacchio, Marco. "Epistemology's Political-Theological Import in Giambattista Vico" in Telos.  Vol. 185 (2019); pp. 105–27. 
Bedani, Gino. Vico Revisited: Orthodoxy, Naturalism and Science in the Scienza Nuova. Oxford: Berg Publishers, 1989.
Berlin, Isaiah. Vico and Herder. Two Studies in the History of Ideas. London, 1976.
Berlin, Isaiah. Three Critics of the Enlightenment: Vico, Hamann, Herder. London and Princeton, 2000.
Bizzell, Patricia, and Bruce Herzberg. The Rhetorical Tradition: Readings from Classical Times to the Present. 2nd ed. Basingstoke: Macmillan; Boston, Ma: Bedford Books of St Martin's Press, 2001. Pp. Xv, 1673. (First Ed. 1990). 2001.
Colilli, Paul. Vico and the Archives of Hermetic Reason. Welland, Ont.: Editions Soleil, 2004.
Croce, Benedetto. The Philosophy of Giambattista Vico. Trans. R.G. Collingwood. London: Howard Latimer, 1913.
Danesi, Marcel. Vico, Metaphor, and the Origin of Language. Bloomington: Indiana UP, 1993
Fabiani, Paolo, "The Philosophy of the Imagination in Vico and Malebranche". F.U.P. (Florence UP), Italian edition 2002, English edition 2009.
Fisch, Max, and Thomas G. Bergin, trans. Vita di Giambattista Vico (The Autobiography of Giambattista Vico). 1735–41. Ithaca: Cornell UP, 1963.
Giannantonio, Valeria. Oltre Vico – L'identità del passato a Napoli e Milano tra '700 e '800, Carabba Editore, Lanciano, 2009.
 Gould, Rebecca Ruth. “Democracy and the Vernacular Imagination in Vico’s Plebian Philology,” History of Humanities 3.2 (2018): 247–277. 
 Grassi, Ernesto. Vico and Humanism: Essays on Vico, Heidegger, and Rhetoric. New York: Peter Lang, 1990.
Hösle, Vittorio. "Vico und die Idee der Kulturwissenschaft"  in Prinzipien einer neuen Wissenschaft über die gemeinsame Natur der Völker, Ed. V. Hösle and C. Jermann, Hamburg : F. Meiner, 1990, pp. XXXI-CCXCIII
Levine, Joseph. Giambattista Vico and the Quarrel between the Ancients and the Moderns. Journal of the History of Ideas 52.1(1991): 55-79.
Lilla, Mark. G. B. Vico: The Making of an Anti-Modern. Cambridge, MA: Harvard University Press, 1993.
Mazzotta, Giuseppe. The New Map of the World: The Poetic Philosophy of Giambattista Vico. Princeton: Princeton University Press, 1999.
Miner, Robert. Vico, Genealogist of Modernity. Notre Dame: University of Notre Dame Press, 2002.
Schaeffer, John. Sensus Communis: Vico, Rhetoric, and the Limits of Relativism. Durham: Duke UP, 1990.
Verene, Donald. Vico's Science of Imagination. Ithaca: Cornell UP, 1981.
Verene, Molly Black "Vico: A Bibliography of Works in English from 1884 to 1994." Philosophy Documentation Center, 1994.
 Alain Pons, Vie et mort des Nations. Lecture de la Science nouvelle de Giambattista Vico, L'Esprit de la Cité, Gallimard, 2015

External links

Institute for Vico Studies
Entry in the Internet Encyclopedia of Philosophy
Entry in the Stanford Encyclopedia of Philosophy
Entry in the Johns Hopkins Guide to Literary Theory 
Verene, Donald Phillip. , archived from Johns Hopkins University Press.
Vico's Poetic Philosophy within Europe's Cultural Identity, Emanuel L. Paparella
Leon Pompa, Vico's Theory of the Causes of Historical Change, archived at The Institute for Cultural Research
Portale Vico - Vico Portal
Text of the New Science in multiple formats
Essays on Vico's creative influence on James Joyce's Finnegans Wake
Samuel Beckett's essay on Vico and Joyce
Vico's creative influence on Richard James Allen's The Way Out At Last Cycle
Vico's Historical Mythology
 

 
1668 births
1744 deaths
17th-century educators
17th-century Italian male writers
17th-century Italian philosophers
17th-century Neapolitan people
17th-century non-fiction writers
17th-century Roman Catholics
18th-century educators
18th-century Italian male writers
18th-century Italian philosophers
18th-century Neapolitan people
18th-century non-fiction writers
18th-century Roman Catholics
Age of Enlightenment
Aphorists
Catholic philosophers
Christian humanists
Counter-Enlightenment
Enlightenment philosophers
Epistemologists
Historians of philosophy
Intellectual history
Italian educators
Italian logicians
Italian non-fiction writers
Italian philosophers
Italian rhetoricians
Italian Roman Catholics
Male non-fiction writers
Metaphysicians
Metaphysics writers
Ontologists
Philosophers of culture
Philosophers of education
Philosophers of history
Philosophers of language
Philosophers of law
Philosophers of logic
Philosophers of mind
Philosophers of science
Philosophers of social science
Philosophy academics
Philosophy of history
Philosophy of social science
Political philosophers
Rhetoric theorists
Social philosophers
Theoretical historians
Theorists on Western civilization
Trope theorists
University of Naples Federico II alumni
Academic staff of the University of Naples Federico II
Writers about religion and science
World historians